Lauren Santo Domingo (née Davis; born February 28, 1976) is an American entrepreneur, magazine editor, and socialite. She is the co-founder and Chief Brand Officer of online fashion retailer Moda Operandi.

Early life 
Santo Domingo, the daughter of Ronald V. Davis, the former CEO of the Perrier Group of America, and Judy Davis, an artist, grew up in Greenwich, Connecticut. As a model in her teens, she appeared in Sassy frequently, as well as in several commercials, including a Japanese TV spot with Brad Pitt. She attended the Kent School and graduated from the University of Southern California with a degree in history in 1998. While at USC, she was a member of Pi Beta Phi. After graduation, she moved to Paris.

Professional career
Lauren began her career in the fashion closet at Vogue as a fashion assistant. She worked her way up to associate fashion editor and later sittings editor, focusing on the American designer market. She then worked as the PR director for Paris-based label J. Mendel, helping to launch the brand's ready-to-wear collection. She later led the PR department of Carolina Herrera for the Puig Group. Santo Domingo returned to Vogue in 2005 as a contributing editor, where she remains as of 2018.

As a former American Vogue editor, Lauren set out to create a platform that would allow women to shop from complete designer collections – a benefit only offered to editors or stylists at the time. In February 2011, Lauren launched Moda Operandi with Áslaug Magnúsdóttir, changing the way the fashion industry and people shop. The company now has more than 300 employees across eight offices globally, and has raised nearly $300m in funding from top-tier investors.

In March 2023 Santo Domingo was introduced as the Creative Director of the home collection for Tiffany & Co.

Personal life
Considered one of the "100 most influential New Yorkers of the past 25 years" by The New York Observer, Santo Domingo was inducted into Vanity Fair's International Best Dressed List Hall of Fame in 2017.

Lauren is a fundraiser for Democratic political candidates, such as Hillary Clinton, Joe Kennedy, and Kamala Harris.

She is married to Colombian businessman Andrés Santo Domingo, who is the youngest son of Colombian business magnate Julio Mario Santo Domingo, and the co-owner of independent record label Mexican Summer. The couple met in 1998 in Paris.

Santo Domingo lives in New York City with her husband and their two children.

Wedding
Her wedding to Andrés Santo Domingo in Cartagena, Colombia, on January 8, 2008, was deemed “the wedding of the year” by Vogue on the cover of that year's March issue, and a ten-page spread of the nuptials was shot by Arthur Elgort and featured in the magazine. Her nine bridesmaids each wore a dress created by a different designer, and Santo Domingo wore two custom dresses by Olivier Theyskens for Nina Ricci. A portrait of Santo Domingo in her wedding dress was the cover image of Vogue Weddings: Brides, Dresses, Designers, a coffee table book edited by Hamish Bowles and Vera Wang.

References

1976 births
American editors
American magazine editors
Women magazine editors
American socialites
Kent School alumni
Living people
Journalists from New York City
Lauren